An inertial foot pod is a device used to track running measurements such as speed, distance travelled, pace, etc., which would generally only be available on treadmills or with a GPS unit.

This device is usually small and attaches to a runner's foot.  It uses one or more accelerometers and processes several times a second to compute speed.

One example is the foot pod employed by the Polar S625x running computer.

See also
 Musgrave Footprint
 Pedometer

References

Further reading

Sport of athletics equipment